Königsstädtisches Theater was the name of different theater buildings in Berlin in the 19th and 20th century.

Its first director was Karl Friedrich Cerf, who managed it until his death in 1845. An Aktiengesellschaft from its inception, the theater had to rely on financial support by the King of Prussia. When the monarchy stopped its support in 1840, the theater fell on hard times. Involvement in the German revolutions of 1848–49 meant that the theater was closed in 1851 by royal decree.

Cerf's son, had inherited the license and the name from his father, and named the building used by Circus Renz "Königsstädtisches Theater" from 1852 to 1854. In the following years, a number of different theaters used the name but none achieved any lasting success.

The original theater building was used for various purposes after its closure. It was demolished in 1932.

References

Cited sources

External link

1824 establishments in Prussia
1851 disestablishments
Theatres in Berlin